Walter Earl Meyers was Professor of English at North Carolina State University, Raleigh. He is best known as the author of Aliens and Linguists: Language Study and Science Fiction, a book held in over 500 worldCat libraries. He is also the author of A Figure Given: Typology in the Wakefield plays, and the Handbook of Contemporary English.

He is known in the field of science fiction criticism.

References

External links
Problems with Herbert - Meyers' Review of Dune

American academics of English literature
North Carolina State University faculty
Living people
1939 births